The following list includes notable people who were born or have lived in Bath, Maine.

Authors and academics 

Robert Jaffe, physicist
 McDonald Clarke, poet
Eleanor P. Cushing, mathematics professor at Smith College
 Alice May Douglas, poet and author
 George F. Magoun, first president of Iowa College (now Grinnell College)
 Edward Page Mitchell, editorial and short story writer
 William Maxwell Reed, author of children's science books
 Susan Marr Spalding (1841–1908), poet
 Geoffrey Wolff, novelist, essayist, biographer, and travel writer; lives in Bath
 Glenn Cummings, economist, politician and University of Southern Maine President

Business 

 Charles W. Morse, businessman

Media and arts 

 Georgia Cayvan, stage actress
 Claude Demetrius, songwriter
 Emma Eames, singer
 Chad Finn, sportswriter 
 John Adams Jackson, sculptor
 William Zorach, sculptor

Military 

 Charles Frederick Hughes, US Navy admiral
 William Smith, US Army private; Medal of Honor recipient
 Silas Soule, abolitionist and Civil War era soldier

Politics 

 Nathaniel S. Berry, 28th governor of New Hampshire
 Samuel Davis, US congressman
 Thomas W. Hyde, US senator; Union Army general and Metal of Honor recipient; founder of Bath Iron Works
 William King, first governor of Maine
 Arthur Mayo, state legislator
 Freeman H. Morse, US congressman and mayor
 Amos Nourse, physician and US senator
 William LeBaron Putnam, lawyer and politician
 Harold M. Sewall, last United States Minister to Hawaii
 Sumner Sewall, 58th governor of Maine
 Mary Small, politician
 Francis B. Stockbridge, US senator
 Peleg Tallman, US congressman

Science and engineering 

 Edward Davis, buccaneer and engineer
 Francis H. Fassett, architect
 Henry Gannett, geographer
 George Edward Harding, architect
 Robert Jaffe, physicist

References

Bath, Maine
Bath